The Toronto Rock are a lacrosse team based in Toronto playing in the National Lacrosse League (NLL). The 2005 season was the 8th in franchise history and 7th as the Rock.

The Rock continued its dynasty on top of the NLL standings, finishing first in its division for the seventh straight year. The Rock beat the Rochester Knighthawks in the division final and then hosted the Arizona Sting in the championship game. In a decisive win, the Rock beat the Sting 19-13 for their fifth Champion's Cup in seven years, and first without Les Bartley behind the bench.

Regular season

Conference standings

Game log
Reference:

Playoffs

Game log
Reference:

Player stats
Reference:

Runners (Top 10)

Note: GP = Games played; G = Goals; A = Assists; Pts = Points; LB = Loose Balls; PIM = Penalty minutes

Goaltenders
Note: GP = Games played; MIN = Minutes; W = Wins; L = Losses; GA = Goals against; Sv% = Save percentage; GAA = Goals against average

Awards

Roster
Reference:

See also
2005 NLL season

References

External links

Toronto
National Lacrosse League Champion's Cup-winning seasons
2005 in Toronto